Jan Láníček (born 1981) is a Czech historian who studies Czechoslovak Jewish history in the twentieth century and the Czechoslovak government-in-exile. He graduated from Palacký University Olomouc (2006) and received his doctorate from the University of Southampton (2011). He is currently a lecturer at the University of New South Wales in Sydney, Australia. He is the co-editor of the Australian Journal of Jewish Studies. He was the Vice-President (NSW) of the Australian Association for Jewish Studies.

Works

References

Czech expatriates in Australia
21st-century Czech historians
Historians of the Czech Republic
Palacký University Olomouc alumni
Alumni of the University of Southampton
Academic staff of the University of New South Wales
Living people
1981 births